The 2012 British Columbia Scotties Tournament of Hearts presented by Best Western, British Columbia's women's provincial curling championship, was held from January 23 to 29 at the North Shore Winter Club in North Vancouver, British Columbia. The winning team of Kelly Scott represented British Columbia at the 2012 Scotties Tournament of Hearts in Red Deer, Alberta where they finished round robin with an 8-3 record, which was enough to finish 2nd place and clinch a spot in the playoffs. They would win the 1-2 game advance to the final, where they would lose to Alberta.

Qualification process
Ten teams qualified for the provincial tournament through several berths. The qualification process was as follows:

Teams

Standings

Results

Draw 1
January 23, 10:30 AM PT

Draw 2
January 23, 6:30 PM PT

Draw 3
January 24, 10:30 AM PT

Draw 4
January 24, 6:30 PM PT

Draw 5
January 25, 10:30 AM PT

Draw 6
January 25, 6:30 PM PT

Draw 7
January 26, 10:30 AM PT

Draw 8
January 26, 6:30 PM PT

Draw 9
January 27, 9:30 AM PT

Tie Breaker 1
January 27, 2:30 PM PT

Tie Breaker 2
January 27, 7:00 PM PT

Playoffs

1 vs. 2
January 27, 7:00 PM PT

3 vs. 4
January 28, 10:00 AM PT

Semifinal
January 28, 6:00 PM PT

Final
January 29, 4:30 PM PT

Qualification rounds

Round 1
The first qualification round for the 2012 British Columbia Scotties took place from November 19 to 20, 2011 at the Creston Curling Club in Creston, British Columbia. The qualifier was held in a double knockout format, and qualified two teams for the provincial playdowns.

Teams

A Qualifier

B Qualifier

Round 2
The second qualification round for the 2012 British Columbia Scotties took place from November 26 to 27, 2011, at the Juan de Fuca Curling Club in Victoria, British Columbia. The qualifier was held in a double knockout format, and qualified two teams for the provincial playdowns.

Teams

A Qualifier

B Qualifier

Round 3
The third qualification round for the 2012 British Columbia Scotties took place from December 3 to 4, 2011 at the McArthur Island Curling Club in Kamloops, British Columbia. The qualifier was held in a double knockout format, and qualified two teams for the provincial playdowns.

Teams

A Qualifier

B Qualifier

Round 4
The fourth and final qualification round for the 2012 British Columbia Scotties took place from December 16 to 18, 2011 at the Chilliwack Curling Club in Chilliwack, British Columbia. The qualifier was held in a double knockout format, and qualified two teams for the provincial playdowns.

Teams

A Qualifier

B Qualifier

References

British Columbia
Scotties Tournament of Hearts
British Columbia Scotties Tournament of Hearts
Curling in British Columbia